One Punch O'Day is a 1926 American silent sports action film directed by Harry Joe Brown and starring Billy Sullivan, Charlotte Merriam and Jack Herrick. It was distributed by the independent Rayart Pictures, the forerunner of Monogram Pictures.

Synopsis
A young boxer has the whole weight of his town on his shoulders ahead of a major fight.

Cast
 Billy Sullivan as Jimmy O'Day
 Charlotte Merriam as 	Alice Felton
 Jack Herrick as 	Joe Hemingway
 William Malan as 	Elwood Felton
 J.C. Fowler as 	Charles Hargreaves
 Eddie Diggins as 	Kid Martin

References

Bibliography
 Munden, Kenneth White. The American Film Institute Catalog of Motion Pictures Produced in the United States, Part 1. University of California Press, 1997.

External links
 

1920s American films
1926 films
1920s action films
1920s sports films
American sports films
Boxing films
1920s English-language films
American silent feature films
American action films
American black-and-white films
Films directed by Harry Joe Brown
Rayart Pictures films
Silent sports films
Sports action films
Silent action films